Kamal is a rural municipality (gaunpalika) out of seven rural municipality located in Jhapa District of Province No. 1 of Nepal. There are a total of 15 municipalities in Jhapa in which 8 are urban and 7 are rural.

Topgachchi and Lakhanpur which previously were all separate Village development committee merged to form this new local level body. Fulfilling the requirement of the new Constitution of Nepal 2015, Ministry of Federal Affairs and Local Development replaced all old VDCs and Municipalities into 753 new local level body (Municipality).

The rural municipality is divided into total 7 wards and the headquarter of this newly formed rural municipality is situated in Topgachchi.

References

External links
 Official website
 Final District 1-75 Corrected Last for RAJPATRA

 

Rural municipalities in Koshi Province
Populated places in Jhapa District
Rural municipalities of Nepal established in 2017
Rural municipalities in Jhapa District